USS Vigilant may refer to several ships of the United States Navy:

 , a tug commissioned in 1898 and stricken in 1927
 , later USS SP-406, a patrol boat in commission from 1917 to 1918
 HSV Vigilant (JHSV-2), a joint high-speed vessel, later renamed , which entered service in 2013

See also
  for ships of the United States Revenue-Marine (1790–1894) and United States Revenue Cutter Service (1894–1915)
  for ships of the United States Coast Guard (1915–present)

Note
 Ships of the United States Revenue-Marine, United States Revenue Cutter Service, and United States Coast Guard were often placed under the authority of the United States Navy during times of war.

External links
USS Vigilant 

United States Navy ship names